The South African Depression and Anxiety Group (SADAG) is Africa's largest mental health support and advocacy group and is involved in counseling, outreach and capacity building work throughout South Africa. Since 1997, SADAG has initiated rural development projects in communities where there are little or no mental health care services available. These programs have been recognized and endorsed by the World Federation for Mental Health (WFMH) and the World Health Organization (WHO). A study conducted in KwaZulu-Natal province found that 1 in 4 young people (ages 14-24 years) had current thoughts of suicide, thus highlighting the importance of youth mental health in rural areas.  

"Speaking Books" is a project developed by SADAG in an attempt to raise awareness and help alleviate the pandemics of AIDS, Malaria and TB in South Africa. The "Speaking Books" offer a combination of written text and short audio messages. The voices used are those of local celebrities, singers, musicians and sportsmen.

References 

Mental health organisations in South Africa